Manoj Kumar Singh may refer to:
 Manoj Kumar Singh (Indian politician)
 Manoj Kumar Singh (Nepalese politician)
 Manoj Kumar Singh (civil servant)